Right in the Middle of It is a studio album by American country artist Chely Wright. The album was released January 9, 1996 on PolyGram/Mercury Records and contained 11 tracks. The album was co-produced by Ed Seay and Harold Shedd. Although critically acclaimed, the album was not successful. Three of its singles charted in lower-end positions on the North American country charts, which later influenced Wright to leave the label.

Background
Right in the Middle of It was recorded in Nashville, Tennessee at the Music Mill and Money Pit studios. It was co-produced by Ed Seay and Harold Shedd. This was unlike her previous Polydor release entitled Woman in the Moon, which was co-produced by both Shedd and Barry Beckett. Right in the Middle of It contained 11 tracks of material. Three out of the album's eleven tracks were either written or co-written by Wright: the title track, "The Other Woman", and "Gotta Get Good at Givin' Again". The album's production and sound mainly consisted of a traditional country sound that included both uptempo and ballad songs. Charlotte Dillon of Allmusic commented that the album's production included much of "natural country twang". The tenth track on the recording entitled "It's Not Too Late" was co-written by American country artist Tracy Byrd. The sixth track "What I Learned from Loving You" was originally recorded by Lynn Anderson and was a Top 20 country single for her in 1983.

Critical reception

Right in the Middle of It received a positive critical response upon its initial release in January 1996. Charlotte Dillon of Allmusic gave Right in the Middle of It four and a half out five stars, calling it Wright's "album pick". Dillon praised Wright for having the ability to record both ballads and have enough energy to record uptempo country numbers as well. Dillon also stated that many of Wright's musical influences (such as Connie Smith and Buck Owens) have shown influence on many of the album's individual tracks. In addition, Dillon praised Wright's musical experience, stating, "This might only be her second album, but she's had plenty of singing experience, starting with family get-togethers when she was a small child, where singalongs with fiddles and guitars were the norm. Before she hit her teens she had already formed a country band of her own. Early on Wright was exposed to music greats like Loretta Lynn, Buck Owens, Connie Smith, and Conway Twitty. Many of those influences can be heard in the songs on Right in the Middle of It."

Release and chart performance
Right in the Middle of It spawned three singles between 1995 and 1996, all of which charted on the Billboard Magazine country singles chart. The album's lead single entitled "Listenin' to the Radio" was released in October 1995, peaking at number 66 on the Hot Country Singles & Tracks chart and number 84 on the Canadian RPM Country Singles chart. The album's second track "The Love That We Lost" was released as the second single in January 1996, which peaked at number 41 on the Billboard country chart and number 51 on the Canadian RPM country chart. The final single released was "The Love He Left Behind" in 1996, which failed to chart any Billboard chart or in Canada. Right in the Middle of It was officially released on January 9, 1996 on PolyGram/Mercury Records. It was issued originally as a compact disc and a cassette. With the lack of the record's commercial success, Wright would later leave PolyGram/Mercury. She would then sign a deal with MCA Nashville.

Track listings

Compact disc and digital versions

Cassette versions

Personnel
All credits for Right in the Middle of It are adapted from Allmusic.

Musical personnel

 Eddie Bayers – drums
 Larry Byrom – electric guitar
 Butch Carr – triangle
 Joe Chemay – bass
 Tod Culross – clapping
 Cindy Fee – background vocals
 Larry Franklin – fiddle, mandolin
 Paul Franklin – dobro, steel guitar
 John Hobbs – hammond organ, piano, synthesizer, wurlitzer
 Dann Huff – electric guitar
 Mark Lambert – programming
 Anthony Martin – background vocals
 Joey Miskulin – accordion

 Wendell Mobley – background vocals
 John Wesley Ryles – background vocals
 Ed Seay – acoustic guitar
 Mitch Shedd – clapping
 Jimmy Stewart – clapping
 Billy Joe Walker, Jr. – acoustic guitar, electric guitar
 Cindy Richardson Walker – background vocals
 Biff Watson – acoustic guitar, electric guitar
 Dennis Wilson – background vocals
 Chely Wright – background vocals, lead vocals
 Curtis Young – background vocals
 Russ Zavitson – clapping

Technical personnel
 Don Cobb – editing
 Todd Culross – assistant engineer
 Carlos Grier – editing
 Erik Hellerman – assistant engineer
 Mark Lambert – programmer
 Anthony Martin – assistant engineer
 Denny Purcell – mastering
 Ed Seay – engineer, mixing, producer
 Harold Shedd – producer

Release history

References 

1996 albums
Albums produced by Harold Shedd
Chely Wright albums
Mercury Records albums
PolyGram albums